This is the list of notable stars in the constellation Fornax, sorted by decreasing brightness.

See also
Lists of stars by constellation
List of UDF objects (1–500)

References

List
Fornax